DZKB-TV (channel 9) is a television station in Metro Manila, Philippines, serving as the flagship of the news channel CNN Philippines. Owned and operated by Radio Philippines Network, the station maintains an analog transmitter at the RPN Compound, #97 Panay Avenue, Brgy. South Triangle, Quezon City and a digital transmitter located at Crestview Heights Subdivision, Brgy. San Roque, Antipolo, Rizal.

Digital television

Digital channels

UHF Channel 19 (503.143 MHz)

Areas of coverage

Primary areas 
 Metro Manila 
 Cavite
 Bulacan
 Laguna
 Rizal

Secondary areas 
 Portion of Bataan
 Portion of Batangas
 Portion of Pampanga
 Portion of Nueva Ecija

See also
CNN Philippines
Radio Philippines Network
Nine Media Corporation
People's Television Network
List of Radio Philippines Network affiliate stations

References 

Television stations in Metro Manila
Radio Philippines Network stations
Solar Entertainment Corporation
Digital television stations in the Philippines